Hovhannes Hambardzumi Badalyan (December 15, 1924, village of Shavarin, near Hamadan, Iran – August 19, 2001, Yerevan, Armenia) was an Armenian singer (tenor), People's Artist of Armenia (1961) and Professor of Yerevan State Conservatory.

Biography
Badalyan's parents were from the Armenian village of Gardabad near the city of Urmia, and they became refugees when the Turkish army invaded northwestern Iran. Hovhannes attended the local Armenian school in Baghdad, and in 1936 he returned to Iran where he started singing in Nicol Galanderian's choir. In Tehran, he studied and performed with Hambartzoom Grigorian and Karl Kulger. At the age of 22, Badalian left for Armenia, where he attended the Romanos Melikian Music College. In 1948, he joined the Folk Music Instruments Ensemble of the Armenian Radio as a soloist. In 2001, his achievements were recognized with the Movses Khorenatsi Medal. Badalyan performed on many world stages from the Middle East to Europe, Australia, Canada, US and Soviet Union.

Selected discography
Golden Classics - Legendary Armenians - Hovhannes Badalyan

References

External links
To My Mother, performed by Hovhannes Badalyan

1924 births
2001 deaths
Iranian people of Armenian descent
20th-century Armenian male singers
20th-century Iranian male singers
People from Hamadan
Iranian emigrants to the Soviet Union
Iranian expatriates in Iraq